SM*SH is the first studio album by the Indonesian boy band, SM*SH, released in Jakarta on June 26, 2011. The album contains pop-dance music produced by Star Signal, Veronica Lukitoand Lidi Management. It was released by Ancora Music and Star Signal.

The album sold over 1 million copies within six months in Indonesia.

Background and songs 
The band had already released the main single, "I Heart You" and followed with "Senyum Semangat" as the second single. The album contains ten songs that carry the flow of dance-pop and Indo pop. "I Heart You" appears in two versions, an original and an acoustic version. There are four cover versions: "Ada Cinta" (Bening), "Gadisku" (Trio Libels), "Inikah Cinta" (M.E) and "Oh Ya" (Kelompok 3 Suara).

Track listing 

Adapted from:

References 

2011 albums